Space Streakings Sighted Over Mount Shasta is an album by Mount Shasta and Space Streakings, released on October 1, 1996 through Skin Graft Records.

Track listing

Personnel 
Musicians
Jason Benson – drums, percussion
Carl Brueggen – guitar
Captain Insect – bass guitar, vocals, horns
John Forbes – vocals, guitar, harmonica
Kame Bazooka – alto saxophone, vocals
Karate Condor – turntables, guitar, horns
Jenny White – guitar, bass guitar, vocals
Production and additional personnel
Steve Albini – production
Nobtack Koike – illustrations
Rob Syers – illustrations

References

External links 
 

1996 albums
Albums produced by Steve Albini
Skin Graft Records albums
Space Streakings albums